Banco BPM S.p.A. is an Italian bank that started to operate on 1 January 2017, by the merger of Banco Popolare and Banca Popolare di Milano (BPM) (approved by the board of directors on 24 May 2016). The bank is the third largest retail and corporate banking conglomerate in Italy (in terms of total assets in 2016), behind Intesa Sanpaolo and UniCredit. The bank had dual headquarters in Verona and Milan respectively.

The shares of the bank is a constituent of Italian blue chip index FTSE MIB; in 2018 Forbes Global 2000, Banco BPM was ranked the 831st.

History
, the date of formation, Banco BPM is the third largest retail and commercial banking conglomerate by pro forma total assets in Italy, behind UniCredit and Intesa Sanpaolo, and surpassing the former third largest bank Banca Monte dei Paschi di Siena (€164.385 billion at mid-2016). Although the Bank of Italy, the central bank, and Cassa Depositi e Prestiti (CDP), the national investment bank, technically have larger total assets than Banco BPM, they operate in a different line of business.

, Banco Popolare had total assets of €123.699 billion and net assets of €8.876 billion in a consolidated basis, while Banca Popolare di Milano (BPM) had a total assets of €49.698 billion and a net assets of €4.571 billion. However, they had a similar size in terms of market capitalization, both already suppressed Banca Monte dei Paschi di Siena.

The shareholders of Banco BPM are the former shareholders of Banco Popolare and Banca Popolare di Milano in a proposed ratio of 54.626%:45.374%. After the capital increase of Banco Popolare in mid-2016, the final exchange ratio for the merger was 1 share of Banco Popolare to 1 share of Banco BPM, as well as 6.386 shares of Banca Popolare di Milano to 1 share of Banco BPM.

Banco Popolare and BPM themselves were both originated as Popular Banks, a kind of co-operative bank in Italy, based in cities such as Bergamo, Verona, Modena, Novara and Lodi (Banco Popolare) and Milan, Rome (BPM) respectively. They merged and acquired many banca popolare and cassa di risparmio (savings bank) to become the 4th and 9th largest retail and commercial banking conglomerate (excluding CDP) as of 31 December 2015, in terms of total assets, according to a study of Mediobanca. Banco Popolare and Banca Popolare di Milano were about to demutualize in 2016, due to Italian Law No.3 of 2015, but the two banking group forming a new public società per azioni directly, instead of demutualize themselves. A new subsidiary, Banca Popolare di Milano S.p.A., would be establish to run the brand of BPM for a few years. Eventually BPM's subsidiary Banca Popolare di Mantova S.p.A. became the new Banca Popolare di Milano S.p.A..

On 10 February 2017, the "year zero" financial results was announced. Due to 2016 capital increase of Banco Popolare, the new banking group had a pro forma CET1 capital ratio of 12.30% at 31 December 2016.

In the first year of establishment, the bank sold its asset management subsidiary Aletti Gestielle SGR to Anima Holding for €700 million. In the next year, the bank securitized a bad loans portfolio of €5.1 billion gross book value, credited it as "Project Exodus" and sold the securities to the market. The bank also applied for Garanzia sulla Cartolarizzazione delle Sofferenze (GACS), a state guarantee scheme for the senior tranche of the securities.

Controversies
The current Banco BPM CEO Giuseppe Castagna has been investigated because he gave bank fundings for millions Euro towards his Communion and Liberation personal friends facing several conflicts of interest, receiving business favors from them in 2012; but the accusation has been archived in 2016.

He was later investigated to be involved with insider trading practices for Banca Popolare di Milano (Banco BPM branch) in 2017 but the accusation has been archived in May 2018.

References

External links

 

Banks of Italy
Companies based in Milan
Companies based in Verona
Italian companies established in 2017
Banks under direct supervision of the European Central Bank